Dichapetalum gelonioides, the gelonium poison-leaf, is a large shrub or small semi-evergreen tree, up to 5 m tall, originally described from Indo-Malaysian region.

References

Biologically active dichapetalins from Dichapetalum gelonioides.
Cytotoxic constituents from the stem bark of Dichapetalum gelonioides.

gelonioides
Flora of tropical Asia